Melissa Ann Tan is a Malaysian beauty pageant contestant. She became Miss Malaysia Universe 2006 and competed in Miss Universe 2006 and did not placed in Miss Universe pageant.

Miss Malaysia Universe 2006
She won the title of Miss Malaysia Universe in 2006. She then represented Malaysia in the Miss Universe 2006 pageant.

References

Living people
Miss Universe 2006 contestants
Malaysian beauty pageant winners
1981 births